The Fighting Rookie is a 1934 American crime film directed by Spencer Gordon Bennet and written by George Morgan. The film stars Jack La Rue, Ada Ince, DeWitt Jennings, Matthew Betz, Arthur Belasco and Tom Brower. The film was released on May 15, 1934, by Mayfair Pictures.

Plot

Cast          
Jack La Rue as Jim Trent
Ada Ince as Molly Malone
DeWitt Jennings as Police Commissioner
Matthew Betz as Lewis Cantor
Arthur Belasco as Bates
Tom Brower as Tom Malone

References

External links
 

1934 films
1930s English-language films
American crime films
1934 crime films
Films directed by Spencer Gordon Bennet
American black-and-white films
Mayfair Pictures films
1930s American films